Cornelis is a 2010 Swedish biographical drama film directed by Amir Chamdin, about the life of the musician Cornelis Vreeswijk. The soundtrack of the film was composed by Cornelis' son Jack Vreeswijk.

Vreeswijk is portrayed by Hans Erik Dyvik Husby, also known as Hank Von Helvete, former lead singer in the Norwegian rock band Turbonegro. The film centres on Vreeswijk's refuge to Sweden when he was a child and his radical political views, alcoholism and taste for women in his adulthood. The film's premiere in Sweden was 12 November 2010. David Dencik was nominated for a Guldbagge Award for his portrayal of the folk musician Fred Åkerström.

Cast
 Hans Erik Dyvik Husby as Cornelis Vreeswijk
 Malin Crépin as Ingalill Rehnberg
 Helena af Sandeberg as Bim Warne
 David Dencik as Fred Åkerström
 Johan Glans as Anders Burman
 Frida Sjögren as Anita Strandell
 Vera Vitali as Ann-Christin Wennerström
 Pernilla Andersson as Ann-Louise Hanson
 Louis Fellbom as Jack Vreeswijk
 Adrian Munoz Nordqvist as young Cornelis Vreeswijk
 Fabian Fourén as 6 years old Jack Vreeswijk

Reception
The film was generally well received. Svenska Dagbladet stated that the film was made with a "tremendous attention to detail" and that the actors "significantly portrayed" their characters. Aftonbladet stated that Chamdin is "a poetic film narrator who delivers a touching picture of an unusual man", but that the film "tries to show too much, a whole life, at the same time as it shows too little".

References

External links
 
 
 Cornelis at IMCDb.org

2010 films
Swedish biographical films
Films about music and musicians
2010s Swedish-language films
2010s biographical films
Biographical films about musicians
2010s Swedish films